Orthotylini is a tribe of plant bugs in the family Miridae. There are more than 230 described genera in Orthotylini.

Selected genera
The following genera belong to the tribe Orthotylini:

 Acaciacoris Schaffner, 1977 i c g
 Aoplonema Knight, 1928 c g b
 Aoplonemella Forero, 2008 c g b
 Apachemiris Carvalho and Schaffner, 1974 i c g
 Argyrocoris Van Duzee, 1912 i c g
 Ballella Knight, 1959 i c g
 Blepharidopterus Kolenati, 1845 i c g b
 Brachynotocoris Reuter, 1880 i c g
 Brooksetta Kelton, 1979 i c g b
 Ceratopidea Knight, 1968 i
 Cyllecoris Hahn, 1834
 Cyrtorhinus Fieber, 1858 i c g b
 Daleapidea Knight, 1968 i c g
 Diaphnidia Uhler, 1895 i c g
 Dichaetocoris Knight, 1968 i c g b
 Ephedrodoma Polhemus & Polhemus, 1984 i c g b
 Fieberocapsus Carvalho and Southwood, 1955 i c g
 Hadronema Uhler, 1872 i c g b
 Hadronemidea Reuter, 1908
 Heterocordylus Fieber, 1858 i c g b
 Heterotoma Lepeletier & Serville, 1825 i c g b
 Hyalochloria Reuter, 1907 i c g
 Ilnacora Reuter, 1876 i c g b
 Ilnacorella Knight, 1925 i c g b
 Jobertus Distant, 1893 i c g
 Kalania Kirkaldy, 1904 i c g
 Kamehameha Kirkaldy, 1902 i c g
 Koanoa Kirkaldy, 1902 i c g
 Labopella Knight, 1929 i c g b
 Labopidea Uhler, 1877 i c g b
 Lindbergocapsus Wagner, 1960 i g
 Lopidea Uhler, 1872 i c g b
 Lopidella Knight, 1925 i c g b
 Loulucoris Asquith, 1995 i c g
 Malacocoris Fieber, 1858 i c g b
 Mecomma Fieber, 1858 i c g b
 Melanotrichus Reuter, 1875 i g
 Melymacra Schwartz, 2004 i c g
 Nesiomiris Kirkaldy, 1902 i c g
 Noctuocoris Knight, 1923 i c g
 Oaxacacoris Schwartz and Stonedahl, 1987 i c g
 Origonema Forero, 2008 c g b
 Orthotylus Fieber, 1858 i c g b
 Paraproba Distant, 1884 i c g b
 Parthenicus Reuter, 1876 i c g b
 Platycranus Fieber, 1870
 Proboscidotylus Henry, 1995 i c g b
 Pseudoclerada Kirkaldy, 1902 i c g
 Pseudoloxops Kirkaldy, 1905 i c g
 Pseudopsallus Van Duzee, 1916 i c g b
 Pseudoxenetus Reuter, 1909 i c g b
 Renodaeus Distant, 1893 i c g b
 Reuteria Puton, 1875 i c g b
 Saileria Hsiao, 1945 i c g b
 Sarona Kirkaldy, 1902 i c g
 Scalponotatus Kelton, 1969 i c g b
 Sericophanes Reuter, 1876 i c g b
 Slaterocoris Wagner, 1956 i c g b
 Squamocoris Knight, 1968 i c g
 Sulamita Kirkaldy, 1902 i c g
 Texocoris Schaffner, 1974 i c g

Data sources: i = ITIS, c = Catalogue of Life, g = GBIF, b = Bugguide.net

References

 Thomas J. Henry, Richard C. Froeschner. (1988). Catalog of the Heteroptera, True Bugs of Canada and the Continental United States. Brill Academic Publishers.

Further reading

External links

 NCBI Taxonomy Browser, Orthotylini
 

 
Miridae
Hemiptera tribes